Otto Dempwolff (25 May 1871 in Pillau, Province of Prussia – 27 November 1938, in Hamburg) was a German physician, linguist and anthropologist who specialized in the study of the Austronesian language family.

Initially trained as a physician, Dempwolff began his linguistic research while serving as medical doctor in the German colonies German New Guinea and German East Africa. Under the mentorship of Carl Meinhof, he began his academic career at the Hamburgisches Kolonialinstitut, which later became part of the University of Hamburg. In 1931, he founded the "Seminar für indonesische und Südseesprachen", which he headed until his death in 1938. He was also appointed to the "Königlich Preußische Phonographische Kommission" (Royal Prussian Phonographic Commission) for his expertise in medicine, as well as African and Indonesian languages. The purpose of the commission was to record the approximately 250 languages spoken by the prisoners of German WWI PoW camps.

His magnum opus Vergleichende Lautlehre des austronesischen Wortschatzes (Comparative phonology of Austronesian vocabularies) (1934–1937) was the first systematic and comprehensive reconstruction of the Proto-Austronesian sound system and vocabulary.

See also
Proto-Oceanic language

Notes

Bibliography
Dempwolff, Otto (1916). Die Sandawe, Linguistisches und ethnographisches Material aus Deutsch Ostafrika, Abhandlungen des Hamburger Kolonialinstituts. Band XXXIV/Heft 19, L. Friederichsen, Hamburg 1916, 180 Seiten.
Dempwolff, Otto (1920) Die Lautentsprechungen der indonesischen Lippenlaute in einigen anderen austronesischen Sprachen, Habilitationsschrift. ZfES 2.Beiheft, Dietrich Reimer, Berlin 1920, 96 Seiten.
Dempwolff, Otto (1934). Vergleichende Lautlehre des austronesischen Wortschatzes, Band 1: Induktiver Aufbau einer indonesischen Ursprache. Beihefte zur Zeitschrift für Eingeborenen-Sprachen 15. Berlin: Dietrich Reimer.
Dempwolff, Otto (1937). Vergleichende Lautlehre des austronesischen Wortschatzes, Band 2: Deduktive Anwendung des Urindonesischen auf austronesische Einzelsprachen. Beihefte zur Zeitschrift für Eingeborenen-Sprachen 17. Berlin: Dietrich Reimer.
Dempwolff, Otto (1938). Vergleichende Lautlehre des austronesischen Wortschatzes, Band 3: Austronesisches Wörterverzeichnis. Beihefte zur Zeitschrift für Eingeborenen-Sprachen 19. Berlin: Dietrich Reimer.
 Dempwolff, Otto (1939). Grammatik der Jabêm-Sprache auf Neuguinea. Abhandlungen aus dem Gebiet der Auslandskunde, vol. 50. Hamburg: Friederichsen de Gruyter.

External links
Otto Dempwolff (1871-1938), Sprachwissenschaftler (in German)

1871 births
1938 deaths
People from Pillau
People from the Province of Prussia
Linguists from Germany
Linguists of Austronesian languages
University of Königsberg alumni
University of Marburg alumni
Leipzig University alumni
Humboldt University of Berlin alumni
University of Tübingen alumni
Academic staff of the University of Hamburg